The Bohemian wind or böhm ( or Böhmischer Wind) is a katabatic downslope wind, which occurs in East Bavaria, eastern Upper Franconia, the Vogtland, the Ore Mountains, Upper Lusatia, the Sudetes and the Austrian Granite and Gneiss Highland. It is associated with gusty, dry winds and low temperatures. The böhm carries hazy, often slightly dusty air from the Bohemian Basin.

See also 
 List of local winds

Literature 
 Johannes Goldschmidt: Das Klima von Sachsen. Akademie-Verlag, Berlin 1950. In: Abhandlungen des Meteorologischen Dienstes der DDR. No. 3.
 H. Pleiß: Die Windverhältnisse in Sachsen. Akademie-Verlag, Berlin 1951. In: Abhandlungen des Meteorologischen Dienstes der DDR. No. 6.
 Klima und Witterung im Erzgebirge. Akademie-Verlag, Berlin 1973. In: Abhandlungen des Meteorologischen Dienstes der DDR. No. 104.

External links 
 Lokale Windsysteme – Der Böhmische Wind. Thomas Sävert in wetterkanal.kachelmannwetter.com, 13. Februar 2016 (Fokus auf Deutschland).
 Der Böhmische Wind im Bayerischen Wald in Aktion. Video, Sturmjäger Martin Zoidl (auf gewitterhimmel.de).

References 

Wind
Climate of Europe
Bohemian Massif